Tabatha Ricci Fabri Salto (born February 21, 1995) is a Brazilian mixed martial artist, currently competing in the Flyweight division in the  Ultimate Fighting Championship. As of March 7, 2023, she is #15 in the UFC women's strawweight rankings.

Background
Ricci was born and raised in Birigui, Brazil. She has an older sister. Following her father's footsteps, Ricci started training judo at the age of six and took up muay thai at the age of 15. She started training Brazilian jiu-jitsu at the age of 17 and at 18 had her first MMA bout.

She moved to Japan in 2017 for a year to compete in SEIZA competitions, before moving to America to focus on mixed martial arts.

Mixed martial arts career

Early career 
Right after turning eighteen, Ricci made her professional mixed martial arts debut. Having difficulties in finding bouts after winning her first two bouts, Ricci eventually moved to Japan in 2017 to train various disciplines and compete in custom rules bouts. In late 2017 she moved to California in order to focus in her Brazilian jiu-jitsu. In 2020 she signed a three-fight contract with Legacy Fighting Alliance where she ultimately won all of her bouts, defeating Kelsey Arnesen at LFA 90 by the way of unanimous decision, Vanessa Marie Grimes via first round armbar at LFA 98 and finally Shawna Ormsby at LFA 105 via TKO stoppage in the second round.

Ultimate Fighting Championship
Replacing withdrawn Maryna Moroz, Ricci made her promotional debut on 4 days notice against Manon Fiorot on June 5, 2021 at UFC Fight Night: Rozenstruik vs. Sakai. Ricci lost the bout via standing TKO in the second round.

Following her debut returned back to strawweight division and made her sophomore appearance in the organization against Maria Oliveira at UFC Fight Night: Costa vs. Vettori on October 23, 2021. She won the fight via unanimous decision.

Ricci faced Polyana Viana on May 21, 2022 at UFC Fight Night: Holm vs. Vieira. She won the fight via unanimous decision.

Ricci was scheduled to face Cheyanne Vlismas on October 1, 2022 at UFC Fight Night 211. Vlismas pulled out in late August due to personal reasons and was replaced by former UFC Women's Strawweight Championship challenger and inaugural Invicta FC Atomweight Champion Jessica Penne, however the fight was cancelled due to an illness with Penne on the day of the weigh in's. 

Ricci faced Jessica Penne on March 4, 2023, at UFC 285. She won the fight via an armbar in the second round.

Mixed martial arts record

|-
|Win
|align=center|8–1
|Jessica Penne
|Submission (armbar)
|UFC 285
|
|align=center|2
|align=center|2:14
|Las Vegas, Nevada, United States
|
|-
|Win
|align=center|7–1
|Polyana Viana
|Decision (unanimous)
|UFC Fight Night: Holm vs. Vieira
|
|align=center|3
|align=center|5:00
|Las Vegas, Nevada, United States
|
|-
|Win
|align=center|6–1
|Maria Oliveira
|Decision (unanimous)
|UFC Fight Night: Costa vs. Vettori
|
|align=center|3
|align=center|5:00
|Las Vegas, Nevada, United States
|
|-
|Loss
|align=center|5–1
|Manon Fiorot
|TKO (punches)
|UFC Fight Night: Rozenstruik vs. Sakai 
|
|align=center|2
|align=center|3:00
|Las Vegas, Nevada, United States
|
|-
| Win
| align=center| 5–0
| Shawna Ormsby
|TKO (punches)
|LFA 105
|
|align=center|2
|align=center|4:50
|Shawnee, Oklahoma, United States
| 
|-
| Win
| align=center| 4–0
| Vanessa Marie Grimes
| Submission (armbar)
| LFA 98
| 
| align=center| 1
| align=center| 1:07
| Park City, Kansas, United States
|
|-
| Win
| align=center| 3–0
| Kelsey Arnesen
| Decision (unanimous)
|LFA 90
| 
| align=center| 3
| align=center| 5:00
| Sioux Falls, South Dakota, United States
|
|-
| Win
| align=center| 2–0
|Graziele Ricotta
|Decision (unanimous)
|Brazilian Fighting Championship 4
|
|align=center|3
|align=center|5:00
|Ribeirão Preto, Brazil
|
|-
| Win
| align=center|1–0
| Danielle Cunha
| Submission (armbar)
| Fight Masters Combat 1
| 
| align=center| 1
| align=center| 2:30
| São Paulo, Brazil
|
|-

See also
List of current UFC fighters
List of female mixed martial artists

References

External links
 
 

Living people
1995 births
Strawweight mixed martial artists
Mixed martial artists utilizing judo
Mixed martial artists utilizing Muay Thai
Mixed martial artists utilizing Brazilian jiu-jitsu
Brazilian female mixed martial artists
Brazilian Muay Thai practitioners
Female Muay Thai practitioners
Brazilian practitioners of Brazilian jiu-jitsu
Female Brazilian jiu-jitsu practitioners
People awarded a black belt in Brazilian jiu-jitsu
Brazilian female judoka
Ultimate Fighting Championship female fighters
21st-century Brazilian women
People from Birigui